Wajid Shamsul Hasan (died 28 September 2021) was a Pakistani diplomat since June 2008. He served as the High Commissioner of Pakistan to the United Kingdom.

Family
Hasan belonged to Effendi family of Hyderabad also known as Akhund. He was married to Zarina Hasan.

Cricket controversy
In response to the 2010 Pakistan cricket spot-fixing controversy, Hasan condemned the International Cricket Council for banning the three Pakistani players charged with spot-fixing.

References

2021 deaths
Year of birth missing
High Commissioners of Pakistan to the United Kingdom
Sindhi people